Trybulski (masculine), Trybulska (feminine)  is a Polish surname. Notable people with the surname include:

Maurycy Trybulski (1883–1944), Polish academic and animal breeder
Walter J. Trybulski (died 1989), American politician

Polish-language surnames